The 2002 Northeastern Huskies football team represented Northeastern University during the 2002 NCAA Division I-AA football season. It was the program's 67th season and they finished as Atlantic 10 Conference (A-10) co-champions with Maine. Picked to finish 10th in the conference preseason poll, the Huskies went on to set school records for single season overall wins (10) and conference wins (7). They also upset favored Division I-A opponent Ohio 31–0, a marquee win in Northeastern's football program's history. The Huskies were seeded fourth in the 16-team Division I-AA playoffs bracket but lost to Fordham, 24–29, in the first round. Ten players earned spots on the All-Atlantic 10 team.  The Huskies were led by third-year head coach Don Brown.

Schedule

Awards and honors
First Team All-Conference – Steve Anzalone, Liam Ezekiel, Tim Gale, Miro Kesic, John McDonald, Art Smith
Second Team All-Conference – Kurt Abrams, Tom Olivo, Adam Walter
Third Team All-Conference – Adam Bourget
Atlantic 10 Coach of the Year – Don Brown
New England All-Stars – Kurt Abrams, Steve Anzalone, Liam Ezekiel, John McDonald, Art Smith

References

Northeastern
Northeastern Huskies football seasons
Atlantic 10 Conference football champion seasons
Northeastern Huskies football